Andreas Chrysostomou (born 14 January 2001) is a Cypriot professional footballer who plays for Cypriot First Division club Anorthosis. He plays as a midfielder.

Club career

Anorthosis
Chrysostomou made his debut for Anorthosis in a Cypriot Super Cup match against Omonia on 13 July 2021, he scored the only goal for his team.

On 14 January 2022, Anorthosis announced the renewal of Chrysostomou contract until 2025.

Career statistics

1 Including Cypriot Super Cup.

Honours

Club
Anorthosis
Cypriot Cup
Winner: 2020–21

References

External links

2001 births
Living people
Cypriot footballers
Cyprus youth international footballers
Association football midfielders
Anorthosis Famagusta F.C. players
People from Larnaca